Lost Dutchman Mine is a non-linear adventure video game which puts the player in the role of a gold miner, circa 1860 A.D. The game was the biggest success for its publisher, Magnetic Images.

The player was free to roam around the desert and town at will, constrained only by the need to make sure he had enough food to eat and a safe place to sleep. Earning money could be accomplished in a variety of ways, including panning for gold in a river, mining for gold in a cave or capturing a wanted bandit. Food could be purchased or caught from a river if the player had previously acquired fishing gear.

The game became well known for its breezy, free-flowing nature. The game was also notable for not having a single environment for the player to operate in; the location of mines and rivers, and the details of characters a player could meet were different, each time the game was played.

Reception 
Abandonware website Abandonias Ted Striker reviewed Lost Dutchman Mine with: "There are different modes that the game will put you in, which are equally basic and so fun (something basic is something fun). The game runs on real-time and you need to do what you would need to do in a real expedition: get well equipped, be sure to check your supplies often and don't panic once you encounter danger. After all, isn't it, this very feature, that makes a game addictive in the first place ?"

See also
 Lost Dutchman's Gold Mine (American historical site)
 Al Emmo and the Lost Dutchman's Mine (2006 game)

References

External links

Lost Dutchman Mine at Amiga Hall Of Light
Lost Dutchman Mine at Atari Legend

1989 video games
Adventure games
Amiga games
Atari ST games
DOS games
Video games developed in the United States
Video games set in the United States
Western (genre) video games